Nanda Nandan Mahapatra (born 14 March 1959) is an Indian textile technocrat and textile books writer.

Early life and education 
N. N. Mahapatra was born in Cuttack, Odisha. He went on to do B.Sc. Tech in Textile Chemistry from University Department of Chemical Technology (UDCT) now it is ICT (Institute of Chemical Technology), Mumbai University and M.Sc. in Applied Chemistry from Ravenshaw College under Utkal University and was honored with PhD from the Utkal University. He also pursued M.B.A from Institute of Modern Management, Kolkata.

Career 
Mahapatra has authored over 10 books on textile fiber, dyes and dyeing. He is also popular as a speaker at various national and international seminars and conferences. He was the chairman of the Textile Institute (Manchester) Western Indian Section and he was the vice-chairman of the Textile Association of India and was responsible  for organising work shops, seminars and conferences related to Technology, Innovation, Sustainability  and Environment. He received Textile Association of India award for the best book on Textiles for his book “Textile Processing.”

Honours and awards 
 Mahapatra was awarded C Col. FSDC from The Society of Dyers and Colorists, (U.K) for his prestigious in the field of Wet Processing.
 C Text FTI award received  from The Textile Institute, Manchester (U.K) 
 FICS  award received from Indian Chemical Society (India)
 FTA award received from The Textile Association (India) 
 F.I.C award received from The Institution of Chemists (India)
 F.I.E  award  received from The Institution of Engineers (India) on 30th Sept, 2009
 Received  the CENTURY MILLS’ Best Technical Book in Textiles Award  for the book “Textile Processing”
 Received the Life Time Achievement Award for positive contributions in the field of Textile Engineering Area by  Institution of Engineers (India),
 Received Award for Specialised services for Textile & Garment Industry from Garmek and Igmatex organization
 Received the Fellowship Award (FIIChE) from Indian  Institution of Chemical Engineers (India) 
 Received the Fellowship Award  (FAIC) from The American Institute of Chemists,
 He has been admitted Council to The Royal Society of Chemistry as a FELLOW (FRSC, UK) His name is published in The Times (London) newspaper.

Publications 

 Energy Crisis and its solution
 Textile Dyes & Dyeing
 Textile Technology
 Textile Processing
 Textiles and Environment
 Textile Dyes
 Sarees of India
 Textile Dyeing
 Modern Textile Processing
 Textile Printing
 Processing of Fibres in Textile Industries
 Sarees of Odisha
 Functional Finishing of Textiles

References 

People from Cuttack district
1959 births
Utkal University alumni
Living people